Butler House is a historic home located in West Chester, Chester County, Pennsylvania. It was built about 1845, and is a -story brick dwelling in the Federal style. It has a rear ell with porch.  The house has been renovated into apartments.  It was the home of Congressman Thomas S. Butler (1855–1928), father of U.S. Marine Corps Maj. Gen. Smedley Butler (1881–1940).  Maj. Gen. Butler grew up in the house.

It was listed on the National Register of Historic Places in 1980.

References

West Chester, Pennsylvania
Houses on the National Register of Historic Places in Pennsylvania
Federal architecture in Pennsylvania
Houses completed in 1845
Houses in Chester County, Pennsylvania
National Register of Historic Places in Chester County, Pennsylvania